Roger Parish is an Emeritus Professor of botany at La Trobe University, Melbourne, Australia. He was the acting Vice-Chancellor in 2006.

Recent Publications
Suppression and restoration of male fertility using a transcription factor Plant Biotech. J., 5, 297-313 (2007)
The Arabidopsis AtMYB5 gene regulates mucilage synthesis, seed coat development and trichome morphogenesis Plant Cell, 21, 72-89 (2009)
Death of a tapetum: A programme of developmental altruism Plant Science, 178, 73–89. (2010)

External links
Parish's profile at La Trobe University

Living people
Academic staff of La Trobe University
Year of birth missing (living people)